Middleton is a small village and civil parish in the Ryedale district of North Yorkshire, England. It is situated on the A170 road to the west of Pickering.

There is a Church dedicated to St Andrew which is Grade I listed.  Above the entrance to the Church is a sundial that dates back to 1782.

Middleton Hall, next to the church, is a Grade II Listed house dating from the mid 18th century.

References

External links

Villages in North Yorkshire
Civil parishes in North Yorkshire